Central Potiguar is the former mesoregion in the Brazilian state of Rio Grande do Norte.

Microregions
 Angicos
 Macau
 Seridó Ocidental
 Seridó Oriental
 Serra de Santana

Mesoregions of Rio Grande do Norte